Andrew Wyntoun, known as  Andrew of Wyntoun, was a Scottish poet, a canon and prior of Loch Leven on St Serf's Inch and, later, a canon of St. Andrews.

Andrew Wyntoun is most famous for his completion of an eight-syllabled metre entitled, Orygynale Cronykil of Scotland, which contains an early mention of Robin Hood; it is also cited by the Oxford English Dictionary as the earliest work in English to use the word "Catholic":  [spelling modernised] "He was a constant Catholic;/All Lollard he hated and heretic."  Wyntoun wrote the 'Chronicle' at the request of his patron, Sir John of Wemyss, whose representative, Mr. Erskine Wemyss of Wemyss Castle, Fife, possessed the oldest extant manuscript of the work. The subject of the 'Chronicle' is the history of Scotland from the mythical period to the death of Robert Stewart, Duke of Albany in 1420.

The nine original manuscripts of the Orygynale Cronykil of Scotland still subsist today and are preserved within various facilities throughout the United Kingdom. Three out of the eight original manuscripts are currently preserved by the British Library, two are in the possession of the Advocates' Library in Edinburgh; one, within the University of St Andrews Library; another, within the confines of Wemyss Castle and the eighth, privately owned by Mister John Ferguson of Duns, Scottish Borders, Berwickshire. The first edition of the 'Chronicle' (based on the Royal manuscript) was published by David Macpherson in 1795; the second edition was produced by David Laing and published in 1872 and the current standard edition was published by F. J. Amours as The Original Chronicle of Andrew of Wyntoun: Printed on Parallel Pages from the Cottonian and Wemyss MSS., with the Variants of the Other Texts.

The Chronicle is entirely composed of couplets, usually of eight syllables, although frequently there also are lines of six or 10 syllables.

References

 Oxford English Dictionary, New York:  Oxford University Press, 1989

External links

The Robin Hood passage at the TEAMS Medieval Texts website.

Scottish chroniclers
15th-century Scottish writers
15th-century Scottish historians
Priors of Loch Leven
Year of birth uncertain
Early Scots poets
14th-century Scottish historians